Christine Mboma (born 22 May 2003) is a Namibian sprinter who competes in the 100 metres and 200 m. At the age of 18, she won a silver medal in the 200 metres at the 2020 Tokyo Olympics, becoming the first ever Namibian woman to win a women's Olympic medal and breaking the world under-20 and African senior record. Mboma also won the event at the 2021 World Under-20 Championships and Diamond League final, improving her record mark to 21.78 seconds.

In 2021, the 18-year-old set an unratified world under-20 and African senior record of 48.54 s in the 400 metres, which made her the seventh-fastest woman of all time at the event. The mark was established in June, while Mboma had previously twice broken a world U20 record in April of that year.

Prior to the Tokyo Games, World Athletics had announced that Mboma and fellow Namibian sprinter Beatrice Masilingi would not be allowed to compete under the female classification in events between 400 metres and one mile due to its regulations on testosterone levels for athletes with XY disorders of sex development.

Early life
Mboma grew up in Shinyungwe, a village in the Kavango East region of Namibia, as the eldest of three daughters. Her father abandoned her as a baby, and her mother, Patricia, died in 2016 while giving birth, leaving Christine to take care of her younger siblings. Mboma attended Shinyungwe Combined School and then Rocky Crest High School in 2017 and took up athletics.  she attends, together with fellow Namibian Olympian Beatrice Masilingi, Grootfontein Agricultural College.

Career

Junior career
In May 2019, 16-year-old Mboma won the 800 and 1500 metres events at the school's Cossasa Games in Manzini, Eswatini (no WA recognition, its database shows 2m 18.68s in the 800 m on 18 May in Windhoek, Namibia). In July, at the Southern Africa Championships in Moka, Mauritius, she won a bronze medal in the 800 m, clocking 2:17.11.

In November 2020, Mboma won gold medals in the 800m and 1500m races at the Namibian Championships in Windhoek. On 9 December, she won the 400m and 800m events in Pretoria, South Africa; in the former distance she set her personal best of 51.81 s. She clocked an even better time of 51.57 s at the Namibian Youth Games in Windhoek on 17 December.

2021
On 27 March, the 18-year-old improved to 50.97 s and won the 400 m race at the Grand Prix Meet in Oshakati, Namibia. On 11 April, at the All Comers Meet in Lusaka, Zambia, she massively lowered her PB to 49.24 s. She set the Namibian senior and unofficial world under-20 record, breaking previous WU20R mark of 49.42, which was set in 1991 by Gritt Breuer. Beatrice Masilingi came second in 49.53 s. A week later, on 17 April, at the Namibian Championships in Windhoek, Mboma took 0.2 s off her record, stopping the clock at 49.22 s. The next day, the women's 4x100 m relay team set the Namibian record at 44.78 s. On 7 June, Mboma set new PB, Namibian and a meet record of 22.67 s in the 200 m at the Josef Odložil Memorial in Prague to take a gold medal.

On 30 June, Mboma set an unratified African senior and new world U20 record in the 400 m greatly lowering her PB even further. She timed 48.54 seconds to 
break the 49.10 s 1996's mark of Falilat Ogunkoya-Osheku and win the Irena Szewińska Memorial in Bydgoszcz, Poland, becoming the 7th fastest woman of all time in the event with the 12th fastest result ever.

She was withdrawn from the 400 metres race at the delayed 2020 Tokyo Olympics; the Namibian athletics federation announced that she would compete in the 200 m event for which she also qualified. In the 200 m final on 3 August 2021, Mboma won a silver medal, coming in 0.28 seconds behind winner Elaine Thompson-Herah. She became the first Namibian woman ever to win an Olympic medal and the first Namibian medallist since 1996. On 3 September 2021, she won the 200 m event during her debut Diamond League race in Brussels. She concluded her very successful season with a win on 9 September at the Diamond League final in Zürich, clocking 21.78 s to take her first Diamond Trophy. In the process, she also set a new World under 20 and African record by breaking her own record from the Olympics by 0.03 seconds.

Following her record-breaking season, Mboma was awarded the BBC African Sports Personality of the Year award. She also won the Confederation of African Athletics (CAA) African Female Hope Athlete award beating competition from Kenya's Jackline Chepkoech, and Nigeria's Tobi Amusan and Imaobong Uko.

2022
Mboma opened up the season on 15 January with a 11.25 s 100 m performance in Swakopmund.

She became a brand ambassador for Marathon Sugar in 2022.

Testosterone levels controversy
In July 2021, the Namibian National Olympic Committee announced that Mboma and fellow Namibian sprinter Beatrice Masilingi would not be allowed to compete in the 400 m competition at the Tokyo Olympics, due to World Athletics rules requiring that athletes with certain XY DSDs participating in women's running events from 400 metres to one mile cannot have blood testosterone levels above 5 nmol/L. Mboma and Masilingi had undergone a medical assessment at a training camp in Italy in early 2021, at which they tested positive for elevated testosterone levels due to a naturally occurring genetic condition. Both sprinters had been unaware of the condition prior to the evaluation.

Parallels were drawn between Mboma and Masilingi and South African middle-distance runner Caster Semenya, who was the most prominent athlete to be affected by the World Athletics 2018 rule change, and who also did not participate in the 2020 Olympics. The controversy around Mboma's withdrawal centered on the fact that the 2018 rule on testosterone levels explicitly applies to intersex athletes with XY DSDs such as Semenya, while Abner Xoagub, president of the Namibia National Olympic Committee, at first said in a voice clip that Mboma and Masilingi "have XX chromosomes." The World Athletics regulations in question, however, apply only to athletes with an XY karyotype and a DSD diagnosis, casting doubt on Xoagub's statement. Xoagub also accused World Athletics of breaking a confidentiality agreement concerning the results of the initial medical assessment. Prior to the 2020 Olympics, the Namibia NOC issued an official statement acknowledging the assessment of World Athletics while stating that the athletes had previously been unaware of their condition.

Achievements
All information taken from World Athletics profile.

Personal bests

International competitions

Circuit wins and titles
 Diamond League champion 200 m:  2021
 2021 200m: Brussels Memorial Van Damme (21.84), Zürich Weltklasse (21.78  )
 World Continental Tour
 2021 (400 m): Gold level–Bydgoszcz Irena Szewińska Memorial
 2021 (200 m): Bronze level–Prague Josef Odložil Memorial, Silver level–Madrid Meeting

Season's bests

Notes

References

External links
 

2003 births
Living people
Namibian female sprinters
Olympic athletes of Namibia
Olympic silver medalists for Namibia
Athletes (track and field) at the 2020 Summer Olympics
Medalists at the 2020 Summer Olympics
People from Kavango East
Olympic silver medalists in athletics (track and field)
Olympic female sprinters
Diamond League winners
Intersex sportspeople
21st-century Namibian women
Intersex women
Athletes (track and field) at the 2022 Commonwealth Games
Commonwealth Games medallists in athletics
Commonwealth Games bronze medallists for Namibia
Medallists at the 2022 Commonwealth Games